Abu Taher Misbah (born 6 March 1956), also known as Adib Huzur, is a Bangladeshi Deobandi Islamic scholar, academic and author. He is the founder of Madani Nesab, and the first textbook that he wrote for it, Eso Arabi Sikhi, is read as the primary textbook of Arabic learning in Bangladesh.

Early life and education 
Abu Taher Misbah was born on 6 March 1956. His father's name is Mishbahul Haque. Although his ancestral home was in Comilla, he grew up in Dhaka. After studying in Jamia Qurania Arabia Lalbagh, Jamia Nooria Islamia, he completed Dawra-e Hadith (MA) from Al Jamia Al Islamia Patiya in 1977.

Career
He started his career as a teacher at Jamia Islamia Darul Uloom Madania. Later he taught in Jamia Nooria Islamia for about 25 years. While teaching at Nooria Madrasa, he started an education reform movement by publishing the handwritten Arabic magazine Iqra. Later, Madrasatul Madina was established in the light of his thinking.  

Since then he started writing experimental textbooks for Madani Nesab. Later, the teaching method he introduced spread throughout the country. The first textbook he wrote for Madani Nesab was Eso Arabi Sikhi, which is read as the primary textbook of Arabic learning in Bangladesh. Other textbooks authored by him include: Ēsō Saraf Śikhi, Ēsō Nāhu Śikhi, Ēsō Bālāgāt Śikhi, Ēsō Fikāh Śikhi, Ēsō Urdu Śikhi, Ēsō Kalam Mērāmat Kari, Islāmkē Jāntē Halē, Āt Tāmrin, Ēsō Tāfsir Śikhi. Ēsō Kōr'ān Śikhi is the first introductory book on the Qur'an for madrasa students in the Indian subcontinent. Al Manar and Al Muzamul Wasit are two modern Arabic-Bengali dictionaries written by him.

In 1992, he founded Madrasatul Madina under the supervision of Abdul Hai Paharpuri in the light of his thinking.

Literary works 
He is the founding editor of the Bengali literary periodical Masik Al Qalam (Pushp). In the field of Bengali literature, he has shown a new way to the scholars. Many of his disciples devoted themselves to Bengali literary practice. He translated Abul Hasan Ali Hasani Nadwi's Islam and the World, Saviours of Islamic Spirit, Arkane Arbaa, Al Murtaza, Qasasun Nabiyyin and Taqi Usmani's Legal Status of Following a Madhab, Hadhrat Ameer Mu'awiyah aur Tareekhi Haqa`iq into Bengali. He also translated Guru Dutt Singh Dara's Rasul-e Arabi. His travelogue of Hajj as a young man with Muhammadullah Hafezzi, Baitullah's Musafir, Aso Kalam meramat Kari, In Search of Turkistan in Turkey, etc. are his outstanding creations in Bengali literature. Child Aqeedah series, Child Seerat series etc. are notable additions to his children's literature.

Textbook 
 Eso Arabi Shiki
 Eso Sarf Shiki
 Eso Nahb Shiki
 Eso Quran Shiki
 Eso Fiqh Shiki
 Eso Balagat Shiki
 Eso Urdu Shiki
 Eso Tafsir Shiki
 Islamke Jante Hole
 At Tamarin Al Kitabee Ala Tareku Ilal Arabiyyah

Bengali literature 
 Musafir of Baitullah
 Let me repair the pen
 In the shadow of Baitullah
 In search of Turkestan in Turkey
 Listen to the compassionate gardener
 Talebane Ilm Rahe Manzil

Arabic literature 
 Tafsirul Quranul Karim

Translation literature 
 Accept Your Deposit
 Love You O Prophet
 Islam and the World
 Taleb Ilm is the Path of Life
 Kasasun Nabiyin
 Saviours of Islamic Spirit
 Arkane Arbaa
 Gift of the East
 Life and mission of Maulana Mohammad Ilyas
 Hazrat Muabiya RA in history
 My Memories - Some Happy, Some Sad
 What is madhhab and why?
 Maqame Sahaba and Karamate Sahaba
 Duhal Islam

Dictionary 
 Al Manar (Bengali-Arabic)
 Al Muzamul Wasit (Arabic-Bengali)

Editing 
 Taisirul Fikhil Muassar
 Repentance is the reality of forgiveness
 Full of flowers
 Al-Hidayah
 Hayate Muhaddis Rah.
 The light of Hadith is the path of life

Child Aqeedah Series 1 to 10 
 Allah
 Prophet And Messenger
 Heavenly Book
 The Angel
 First Man
 Heaven
 In Hell
 Doomsday
 Final Judgment
 Mud House

Child Seerat Series 1 to 10 
 Prophet in Mecca
 Prophet in Medina
 Prophet in the field of Jihad 1
 Prophet in the field of Jihad 2
 Nabiji was like that 1
 Nabiji was like that 2
 The Prophet loved you
 Nabi's Muʿjiza
 Prophet said
 Prophet in the eyes of non-Muslims

References 

Deobandis
1956 births
People from Dhaka
Bangladeshi Sunni Muslim scholars of Islam
Hanafis
Bengali-language writers
Al Jamia Al Islamia Patiya alumni
20th-century Muslim scholars of Islam
Bangladeshi Muslims
Living people
21st-century Bengalis
People from Comilla District
Bengali Muslim scholars of Islam